Lekamøya  is a mountain in the municipality of Leka in Trøndelag county, Norway. Viewed from southeast, the mountain looks like a woman, and has been part of a local legend.

References

Mountains of Trøndelag
Leka, Norway